Shiva, in comics, may refer to:

 Lady Shiva, a DC Comics supervillain and assassin
 Shiva, a robotic Weapon X enforcer in Marvel Comics
 Kaiyanwang, a.k.a. Shiva, a fictional character in the manga 3×3 Eyes

See also
Shiva (disambiguation)